Sen. William P. Jackson House was a historic home located at Salisbury, Wicomico County, Maryland. It was a -story Queen Anne frame house completed in 1893. It was torn down in November 1976, after a ten-year battle to save it.  It was built by United States Senator William P. Jackson.

It was listed on the National Register of Historic Places in 1976.

References

External links
, including photo from 1975, at Maryland Historical Trust

Houses in Wicomico County, Maryland
Houses on the National Register of Historic Places in Maryland
Houses completed in 1893
Queen Anne architecture in Maryland
Buildings and structures in Salisbury, Maryland
National Register of Historic Places in Wicomico County, Maryland
Demolished buildings and structures in Maryland
Buildings and structures demolished in 1976